The National Liberal Party (PNL) is a liberal-conservative political party in Romania (and the second largest overall political party in the country as of early 2023). Re-founded in mid January 1990, shortly after the Revolution of 1989 which culminated in the fall of communism in Romania, it claims the legacy of the major political party of the same name, active between 1875 and 1947 in the Kingdom of Romania. Based on this legacy, it often presents itself as the first formally constituted political party in the country and the oldest party from the family of European liberal parties as well.

Recent historical overview 

Until 2014, the PNL was a member of the Alliance of Liberals and Democrats for Europe (ALDE). The party statutes adopted in June 2014 dropped any reference to international affiliation, consequently most of its MEPs joined the European People's Party Group (EPP) in the European Parliament.

On 12 September 2014, it was admitted as a full member of the European People's Party (EPP), and subsequently merged with the Democratic Liberal Party (PDL). The party was also a member of the Liberal International (LI) before switching to Centrist Democrat International (CDI). Currently, it is the second-largest party in the Romanian Parliament, with 81 seats in the Chamber of Deputies and 39 in the Senate, behind the Social Democratic Party (PSD). Additionally, the party currently has the largest number of MEPs in the European Parliament on behalf of Romania (more specifically 10 out of 33).

At local political level, the PNL has been very closely associated with either the Democratic Forum of Germans in Romania (FDGR/DFDR), more specifically in parts of Banat and Transylvania, or, formerly, with the Christian Democratic National Peasants' Party (PNȚCD), in southern Romania.

After it won the 2020 local elections, the PNL became the first political party in Transylvania, Banat, and Bukovina, establishing new political alliances at national level with, most notably, USR PLUS shortly thereafter. Moreover, as of early 2022, the PNL also holds the largest amount of incumbent county councillors and local councillors nationwide, making it, in these regards, the most influential political party in Romania at local level. Nonetheless, concerning the total amount of mayors, the PNL comes second behind the PSD.

During late 2021, the PNL broke the alliance with USR PLUS (now simply legally known as USR) and continued under former party president Cîțu a minority government alongside the Hungarian minority-oriented UDMR/RMDSZ (with the support of President Klaus Iohannis), consequently contributing to the three month-long 2021 Romanian political crisis, until successfully negotiating with their historical nominal adversaries PSD in early November 2021 a grand coalition government between themselves and the UDMR/RMDSZ (known as the National Coalition for Romania or CNR for short), thereby leading to the formation of the incumbent Ciucă cabinet led by Nicolae Ciucă (current leader of the PNL since April 2022 onwards).

History

Re-foundation and first governing experiences after the 1989 Romanian Revolution (1990–2000) 

The National Liberal Party of Romania (PNL) was re-founded in January 1990, a few days after the end of the violent Romanian Revolution. During the early 1990s, the party primarily revolved around the presidencies of Radu Câmpeanu and Mircea Ionescu-Quintus, both former members of the historical PNL and liberal youth leaders during the interwar period as well as during and shortly after World War II.

At the 1990 general elections, the PNL became the third largest party in the Parliament of Romania and its then re-founding leader, Radu Câmpeanu, finished second in the same year's presidential elections, with 10.6% of the cast votes, behind Ion Iliescu. In December 1990, the Socialist Liberal Party (PSL) led by Niculae Cerveni established an alliance with the PNL and the latter became vice-president of the PNL led by Câmpeanu at that time.

Shortly afterwards, at the main request and most notably alongside the Christian Democratic National Peasants' Party (PNȚCD), but to a lesser extent also with other smaller center-right parties and NGOs, the PNL managed to form the Romanian Democratic Convention (CDR) in an effort to assemble a stronger collective opposition and alternative governing body to then ruling National Salvation Front (FSN), which was, in many ways, the heir of the Romanian Communist Party (PCR). However, prior to the 1992 general elections, Câmpeanu decided to withdraw the party from the CDR electoral alliance and instead compete as a stand-alone political force. One of the main reasons for doing so was Câmpeanu's reluctance for the PNL to run on common lists with the Democratic Alliance of Hungarians in Romania (UDMR/RMDSZ).

This had ultimately proven to be an eventual major strategic error for the PNL, as the party did not manage to surpass the needed electoral threshold for parliamentary presence and as such was forced to enter extra-parliamentary opposition for the period 1992–1996. Furthermore, this political decision also resulted in several splinter factions leaving the main party, with some PNL deflecting groups opting to remain within the CDR while others still supporting Câmpeanu's side in a new party which was called PNL-C. Therefore, the factions which deflected from the main PNL and aligned themselves with the CDR were PNL-CD (led by Niculae Cerveni), PNL-AT, and PL '93. Other minor liberal political parties such as PAC and UFD (which later merged into the main PNL) were also part of the CDR throughout the late 1990s.

Nevertheless, after a change of leadership that saw Ionescu-Quintus as the new party leader elected in 1995, the PNL contested the 1996 general election once again as part of the CDR. The 1996 general elections represented the first peaceful transition of power in post-1989 Romania, with the PNL, PNȚCD, Democratic Party (PD), and the Democratic Alliance of Hungarians in Romania (UDMR/RMDSZ) forming a grand coalition that pushed the PDSR (formerly the FSN and FDSN) in opposition for the period 1996–2000. Furthermore, the presidency was also won by the CDR's common candidate, more specifically Emil Constantinescu, who received support on behalf of all of the alliance's constituent parties (including the PNL political groups therein).

Opposition and second governing experiences (2000–2010) 

Between 1996 and 2000, because of the lack of political coherence within the parties of the governing CDR coalition and the multiple changes of cabinets that followed throughout this entire period of time, the PNL decided once more to withdraw from the alliance just before the 2000 general election and, consequently, to compete alone instead. This time, the party managed to gain parliamentary presence but failed to form another centre-right government, finishing fourth in the legislative elections and third in the presidential election. However, a splinter group founded by Dan Amedeo Lăzărescu and led by Decebal Traian Remeș which was called PNL-T decided to remain within CDR 2000 and contest that year's general election by supporting Mugur Isărescu as presidential candidate.

Therefore, during the mid 2000s (more specifically starting in 2003), the PNL joined forces with the PD in order to form the Justice and Truth Alliance (DA) so as to compete in the 2004 general election as an alternative to the then ruling PSD (formerly PDSR) government. The alliance managed to finish second by popular vote in the Parliament, subsequently form a centre-right cabinet, and also win the presidency during the same year.

Until April 2007, the PNL was the largest member of the governing Justice and Truth Alliance (DA), which enjoyed a parliamentary majority due to an alliance between the PNL, PD, the Conservative Party (PC), and the UDMR/RMDSZ. In April 2007, then PNL Prime Minister Călin Popescu-Tăriceanu, who was also the party president, formed a minority government solely with the UDMR/RMDSZ and the remainder PD ministers were reshuffled. This caused internal opposition within the party and led to the scission of a splinter group which turned into a political party under Theodor Stolojan, more specifically the Liberal Democratic Party (PLD), eventually merging with the PD to form the Democratic Liberal Party (PDL).

After the 2008 legislative election, the party placed third and entered official opposition, winning 19.74% seats in the Parliament, while the new grand coalition, formed by their former enlarged ally, the Democrat Liberals (PDL) and the Social Democratic Party (PSD), obtained roughly 70% together. At the 2009 presidential election, the National Liberal Party's then newly elected leader, Crin Antonescu, finished third in the first round and the party would still find itself in parliamentary opposition for the three next years to come up until the accession of the Social Liberal Union (USL) to governance in mid 2012.

At the same time, Klaus Iohannis, at that time solely FDGR/DFDR president, was nominated twice by the PNL (along with their most sturdy and powerful allies, the PSD and the PC) in 2009, but was rejected by then state president Traian Băsescu.

Transition from USL to ACL and third governing experiences (2010–2020) 

On 5 February 2011, the PNL formed the Social Liberal Union (USL) political alliance with the PSD, the National Union for the Progress of Romania (UNPR), and the Conservative Party (PC). The PNL subsequently exited the USL on 25 February 2014, disbanding the alliance and returning to opposition. On 26 May 2014, following the 2014 European elections, then PNL party president Crin Antonescu announced he was seeking membership within the European People's Party (EPP). At the beginning of the 8th European Parliament, 5 of the PNL MEPs sat with the EPP Group, and 1 with the ALDE Group, who later became an independent MEP within ALDE. In late May 2014 the party agreed to a future merger with the Democratic Liberal Party (PDL), with the two parties main short-time goal being to submit a joint candidate for the upcoming presidential election. The PNL-PDL presidential candidate was agreed to run under an electoral banner called the Christian Liberal Alliance (ACL).

On 27 June 2014, former PNL chairman Călin Popescu-Tăriceanu announced his intention to found a separate liberal party to run for president, stating opposition to the upcoming merger with the PDL. The breakaway party, called the Liberal Reformist Party (PLR), was founded by Popescu-Tăriceanu on 3 July 2014. On 17 July 2014, it was announced that the future merger of the PNL and PDL would retain the National Liberal Party name, while being situated in the PDL's existing headquarters in Bucharest, and would be legally registered by the end of 2014. On 26 July 2014, a joint party congress of the PNL and PDL approved the merger.

In the first round of the 2014 presidential election on 2 November 2014, ACL presidential candidate Klaus Iohannis, PNL party president and Mayor of Sibiu was the runner-up. Iohannis won the runoff election held on 16 November 2014 with 54.5% of the total number of votes. At the 2016 local elections and legislative elections, the PNL managed to finish second, behind the PSD, and consequently in continuous opposition until 2019 when it regained executive power.

Regarding the 2019 presidential election, the party previously announced its formal support for a second term of incumbent state president Klaus Iohannis in March 2018 along with an official designation of Ludovic Orban, current party president, for the position of Prime Minister should the PNL win the 2020 legislative elections. In June 2018, at an open air press conference in his native Sibiu, Iohannis publicly announced his intention to run for a second presidential term.

The year 2019 saw two minor parties adhering to the PNL, namely the PND (led by Daniel Fenechiu) and PACT (led by Sebastian Burduja), thereby increasing its total number of members. In late 2019, the National Liberal Party acceded to governance under a minority stand-alone government led by Orban which was voted twice by the Parliament (under, most notably, a confidence and supply agreement with USR and PMP as well as most ethnic minority parties, including most importantly the FDGR/DFDR). At national level, the greatest two challenges that the Orban cabinet tried to monitor, control, and solve are the ongoing COVID-19 pandemic as well as its affiliated recession.

Brief alliance with USR PLUS and fourth governing experiences (2020–present) 

The PNL ran in several electoral alliances with the 2020 USR-PLUS Alliance for the 2020 Romanian local elections, winning the mayor of Bucharest (along with several of the capital's sectors) as well as many other municipalities throughout the countryside. Shortly thereafter, the PNL decided to form local alliances with, most notably, USR PLUS, PMP, and FDGR/DFDR (as well as with two local branches of the PNȚCD and UDMR/RMDSZ in Hunedoara County). After the 2020 Romanian legislative election, the party agreed to form a coalition government alongside USR PLUS and UDMR in order to reportedly provide a stable governance for the next 4 years in Romania.

Furthermore, incumbent party president Ludovic Orban decided to step down as Prime Minister in early December 2020, letting Nicolae Ciucă acting until the new coalition received the confidence vote in the Parliament after the 2020 legislative elections concluded with concrete, positive results on behalf of a future center-right government. Subsequently, the newly proposed Prime Minister on behalf of the PNL was Florin Cîțu, who previously served as the Minister of Public Finance in both Orban cabinets between 2019 and 2020. Therefore, Cîțu took office on 23 December 2020, after an overwhelming confidence vote in the Parliament (260 for in counterpart to 186 against).

In the meantime, it has been announced that a new party congress will take place on 25 September 2021 with 5,000 delegates. At the forthcoming congress, incumbent party president Ludovic Orban will face incumbent Prime Minister Florin Cîțu for the leadership of the party during the upcoming years (although it has been rumoured that Dan Motreanu, former Minister for Agriculture in the First Tăriceanu Cabinet between 2006 and 2007, would also announce his candidacy at a later point during 2021 but the latter eventually declined it). Furthermore, this new congress will also determine the leadership of PNL at each and every level within the party nationwide. Nonetheless, up until the date of the congress, Orban will still remain party president. At the same time, the struggle for power within the PNL between Cîțu and Orban (each one along with their respective teams of supporters) considerably bogged down the pace of reforms applied by the government.

Major involvement in the 2021 Romanian political crisis 

During early September 2021, several weeks prior to the new congress of the party, USR PLUS decided to exit the Cîțu Cabinet in protest to Cîțu's dismissal of the Minister of Justice; the initial coalition consisting of three centre-right parties was thereby disbanded and reduced to two, with the USR PLUS officially entering opposition and even publicly declaring that they will support any motion of no confidence against Cîțu in the future, deeming him responsible for creating a major governmental crisis in the process.

Moreover, according to USR PLUS, Cîțu is also responsible for legalizing massive theft from public procurement money with the approval of PNDL 3 (overtaking, in this regard, even convicted former PSD leader Liviu Dragnea) in the prospect of bribing PNL mayors (referred to as "local barons" in a press report by USR PLUS) to side with him for the then upcoming party congress which was held on 25 September 2021.

In response, Cîțu stated: "only this [three-party] coalition is feasible for Romania. It's that political setup that can handle European Union's recovery plan, our local development, and make use of EU money," after an emergency meeting of the party. He also stated that "this is my message for the coalition talks later today, we have all promised Romania's investments".

Additionally, in response to sacking the Justice Minister, Cîțu mentioned in a late night news briefing the following: "I will not accept ministers in the Romanian government who oppose the modernisation of Romania. Blocking the activity of the government only because you do not agree to develop the communities, means violating the mandate given to you by the parliament through the governing programme.", referring to a 50 billion lei ($12 billion) allegedly local development financing scheme aimed at modernizing decrepit infrastructure in the countryside and the plan which needed the justice ministry's seal of approval.

Eventually, the PNL was helped to maintain a minority cabinet along with the UDMR/RMDSZ after they boycotted the no confidence motion initiated by the USR PLUS and AUR, with the help of both PSD and UDMR/RMDSZ parliamentary groups. In the meantime, Cîțu posted a video portraying himself as Superman on Instagram. In response, the Romanian internet community made a video in which he was portrayed as the psychopathic supervillain Joker. Moreover, Ludovic Orban hinted a psychiatric consultation for Cîțu, in reaction to the Instagram videoclip.

In addition, it was also in 2021 that, at local political level, the PNL lost other former allies, more specifically the PMP, who veered towards PSD and PRO Romania, establishing new political alliances in some counties (most notably Caraș-Severin) with the two centre-left political parties. In the meantime, former Deputy Prime Minister Dan Barna said that "if USR PLUS will remain in opposition, it will win the electorate of the right [in 2024]". Additionally, Marcel Ciolacu, the incumbent president of the Social Democratic Party (PSD) and thereby the leader of the then largest opposition party, stated on 20 September 2021 that PSD will vote for the no confidence motion initiated by the USR PLUS and AUR. In the meantime, PNL president Ludovic Orban clearly stated that "Cîțu could only remain Prime Minister with the support of PSD which would be a catastrophe for both Romania and the PNL". In stark contrast to Orban's statement, Iohannis declared that he still supports Cîțu and that he has no reasons whatsoever for resigning or for being ousted. Nonetheless, in late September 2021, DNA officially started the criminal investigation in Florin Cîțu's case on the grounds of abuse of office and incitement to abuse of office as Prime Minister.

Several noteworthy Romanian journalists such as Cristian Tudor Popescu, Lucian Mîndruță, and Ramona Ursu have also criticized Cîțu and his actions as Prime Minister and have described themselves totally revolted with respect to why would he still be left to serve as Prime Minister.

All throughout this period of time, the political crisis had severe results in the economy of the country, with the euro rising consistently above the leu, as reported by the National Bank of Romania (BNR) in the beginning of the autumn of 2021. Furthermore, during late September 2021, the USD had also risen consistently above the RON, as the political crisis kept on lingering. In addition, the finance department of Bloomberg also noted the record inflation levels which rose to the highest charting positions in the last three years in Romania in early September 2021.

As of 12 September 2021, most of the initial PNL-USR PLUS local alliances established after the 2020 local elections have been disbanded, with the USR PLUS entering official opposition at all local levels towards the PNL. The PNL also has a local governing alliance with the PSD in Ialomița.

Cîțu's leadership (September 2021–April 2022) 

On 25 September 2021, at the PNL congress held at Romexpo in Bucharest, Florin Cîțu was elected the 10th post-1989 president of the PNL with 2,878 votes out of 4,848 total delegates, being congratulated, most notably, by congress organiser Theodor Stolojan, amidst significant heavy fraud allegations claimed, most importantly, by previous PNL president Ludovic Orban and subsequently by Adrian Veștea. Nonetheless, Orban congratulated Cîțu but also said that he no longer has a partnership with Iohannis. Furthermore, he also stated that he resigns from the office of the President of the Chamber of Deputies. The Romanian press had also cited Cîțu's triumph as a Pyrrhic victory as, on the one hand, PSD announced that they will vote the no confidence motion initiated by USR PLUS and AUR and, on the other hand, USR PLUS also stated that they will no longer want to govern under Cîțu.

On 26 September 2021, the party's new leadership team under Cîțu was voted, validated, and consequently established as well. Shortly after the congress, on 27 September, former president Ludovic Orban stated that Cîțu became persona non grata for a huge number of Romanian citizens and that he doesn't understand he will no longer be PM for too long, only with the mercy of PSD. In the meantime, the PNRR (part of the Next Generation EU package and short for ) was signed and adopted in Bucharest on the occasion of Ursula von der Leyen's visit, mandated by the European Commission. The Romanian PNRR is the 5th Next Generation EU plan adopted by volume of funds and most of the work and successful negations on it were carried out by USR PLUS ministers, in particular Cristian Ghinea. Most opinion polls conducted throughout 2021 registered a significant drop of trust both in Cîțu as PM and in the PNL in the perspective of the next Romanian legislative elections which are most likely going to take place in 2024. In the meantime, PSD initiated its own motion of no confidence which is scheduled to be debated on 30 September and voted on 5 October. 
In addition, former party president Valeriu Stoica accused the recent political behaviour of PNL in the following manner: "PNL acts like PSD", further stating that the party is operating on a catch all ideology and consistent party switching as well as currently defying and breaching the constitution.

On 5 October 2021, the Cîțu cabinet was ousted by an overwhelming vote on behalf of the PSD, AUR, and USR parliamentary groups at the no confidence motion debated and voted during that day. The no confidence motion was voted by 281 MPs, the largest number of votes to dismiss a government in Romania's post-1989 history. Nevertheless, Cîțu still served as acting/ad interim Prime Minister until a new government will be validated by vote in the Parliament and then subsequently sworn in (i.e. for at least one week from October 5 until still incumbent President Klaus Iohannis will call for party consultations). In the meantime, former PNL president Valeriu Stoica heavily criticized Iohannis for allowing "mediocre people at the leadership of the party" since 2014 onwards. He previously also stated that the PNL would demonstrate gross political immaturity if they will still propose Cîțu as Prime Minister at subsequent party consultations scheduled to take place at the Cotroceni Palace. At the same time, he mentioned that Iohannis should have that the political status quo imposed Cîțu's resignation, avoiding as such the motion of no confidence.

On 11 October, still incumbent President Klaus Iohannis nominated USR leader and former Prime Minister Dacian Cioloș to form a new government. Cioloș was subsequently rejected by the parliament and Iohannis appointed previous acting PM Nicolae Ciucă instead on 21 October 2021. In late October, relatively shortly after his dismissal, Cîțu's approval rate hit 7% nationwide, a negative record for him. Given the matter, Cîțu resorted to buying Facebook likes from countries such as Vietnam, the ones from the ex-Soviet Union and from the Arab world, partly according to an analysis by former Health minister Vlad Voiculescu of Save Romania Union (USR). In early November 2021, journalist Lucian Mîndruță heavily criticized Iohannis and PNL for making an alliance with PSD, also stating that PSD is the only political party in post-1989 Romania which acceded to governance by "walking on corpses", a reference to the dreadful demographic effects of the ongoing COVID-19 pandemic in Romania.

In mid-early November 2021, several noteworthy political sources hinted a very probable merger of PMP with PNL sometime in the near future (although previous PMP president Cristian Diaconescu publicly dismissed this scenario on his Facebook page) and even a possible, hypothetical absorption of ALDE afterwards (paradoxically enough, thereby subsequently producing the return of Călin Popescu-Tăriceanu in the party he had previously left in 2014), just after the exclusion of Ludovic Orban from the party on 12 November 2021, who stated that "he is [now] free to build a new political force". At an official level however, Cristian Diaconescu later stated that there are indeed negotiations between the delegations of the two parties for a "common political project". Shortly afterwards, incumbent party president Cîțu stated, in the context of the ongoing negotiations with the PSD, that "it is a major compromise that PNL does" (i.e. to make a government with PSD). In stark contrast, former PNL president Orban stated that "a monster is being built" (in reference to the subsequent hypothetical longtime alliance between PSD and PNL) and that he has the obligation to the people who voted for PNL to represent them, as such siding with USR in the process. Subsequently, Diaconescu totally dismissed the possibility of a hypothetical merger between PMP and PNL during his term as PMP president, instead expecting a future invitation to governance, even though PMP is currently extra-parliamentary. On 22 November 2021, Nicolae Ciucă was officially designated PM by Klaus Iohannis, being in charge of a grand coalition government known as the National Coalition for Romania (CNR for short). Shortly afterwards, on 23 November 2021, former PNL president Ludovic Orban had officially resigned from the party along with 16 others PNL MPs. In December 2021, Orban officially founded his party which is called "Force of the Right" (or FD for short).

In early 2022, incumbent PNL spokesman Ionuț-Marian Stroe announced that the PNL has just started negotiations for a very probable near future merger with ALDE, but without former ALDE president Călin Popescu-Tăriceanu, who is no longer even a member of the latter party. In addition, it was confirmed that PNL is also currently negotiating with PMP for a future merger as well. On 2 April 2022, Florin Cîțu resigned from the position of PNL president and prior to this decision Dan Vîlceanu also announced his resignation as secretary-general of the party. Gheorghe Flutur, president of the Suceava County council, became acting/ad interim president of the PNL on 2 April 2022 until a new congress was held on 10 April 2022.

Ciucă's leadership (April 2022–present) 

At an extraordinary party congress held on 10 April 2022, Nicolae Ciucă was elected the 11th post-1989 president of the PNL with 1,060 valid votes out of 1,120 total ones (60 were nullified and 159 were abstentions). Thus, Nicolae Ciucă became the first military leader in the history of the party. Additionally, Ciucă's primary objective as PNL president is very likely to maintain the cohesion of the CNR grand coalition until the end of his term as PM (which is quite probable to occur in May 2023). 

In terms of external politics, the CNR government led by Ciucă expressed serious concern over the ongoing Russo-Ukrainian War. Internally, the PNL chose their new secretary-general on 27 May 2022, when the party's national council re-united to vote for this position in front of 1,000 national delegates.

Scissions and mergers

Parties seceded from PNL 
 National Liberal Party - Youth Wing (1990);
 Liberal Union–Brătianu (1990);
 National Liberal Party - Democratic Convention (1991);
 National Liberal Party-Câmpeanu (1995);
 Liberal Democratic Party (2006);
 Liberal Reformist Party (2014);
 Liberal Right Party (2019);
 Force of the Right (2021);
 Liberal Conservative Platform (2022).

Parties absorbed by PNL 

 Socialist Liberal Party (1990);
 Progressive Peasant Party (1993);
 New Liberal Party (1993);
 Liberal Party '93/Liberal Party (1998);
 Civic Alliance Party (1998);
 Alliance for Romania (2002);
 Union of Right-wing Forces (2003);
 National Liberal Party-Câmpeanu (2003);
 People's Action (2008);
 Democratic Force (2012);
 Democratic Liberal Party (2014);
 Popular Party (2015);
 National Democratic Party (2019);
 Youth Civic Action Platform (2019);
 Alliance of Liberals and Democrats (2022).

Ideology 

The party adheres to the doctrine of liberalism in the form of conservative liberalism and liberal conservatism, advocating both economic and social liberalization. The party also takes a pro-European stance. In recent years, it has focused more on economic liberalism and a shift to a more catch all platform. The National Liberal Party (PNL) also supports conservative initiatives and policies and the state in moral and religious issues, as well as the privatization and denationalization of the economy, a trend which is currently  taking place quite rapidly in Romania, as in other post-communist economies in Central and Eastern Europe. Unlike its Western counterparts, the party is more nationalist and traditionalist on social issues, such as LGBT rights.

The party has factions of adherence to Christian democracy, national liberalism, ethnic nationalism, neoliberalism, and social conservatism. The party has also been described as populist, while former president Florin Cîțu rejects this qualification. However, after joining the European People's Party (EPP) and especially under Cîțu and Ciucă's leadership, the party became more conservative, Radio Free Europe calling it "liberal only in the name". Since PNL's alliance with the PSD, its ruling became increasingly authoritarian.

In economic regards, it deems significant the fact that taxes must be lowered and that the private sector of the national economy must be expanded and helped by a series of new laws in order to generate more value. It also advocates a decentralization of Romania's political structure, with greater autonomy given to the eight development regions.

Structure 
According to the statute, the leading organs of the party are the following:

Congress 
The Congress, or The General Assembly of the delegates of the party's members is the supreme authority in the party. It leads the party and takes decisions at national level. Its members are elected by the local (territorial) organizations, and The National Consillium. The Congress meets every four years, after the parliamentary elections, or at any time needed. The Congress is convoked either by the Permanent Delegation (see below), at the request of the Central Political Bureau, or at the request of at least half of the Territorial Permanent Delegations. The Congress elects the President of the National Liberal Party, the 15 vice-presidents of the Central Standing Bureau (7 with specific attributions and 8 responsible for the development regions), 23 judges of The Honor and Referee Court, 7 members of The Central Committee of Censors.

The last congress took place at Romexpo in Bucharest on 25 September 2021, when the 10th post-1989 president of the party was elected being Florin Cîțu.

Permanent Delegation 
The Permanent Delegation ( – DP) is the structure that leads the party between two Congresses. It meets monthly, or at any time needed. Its members are the following; the President of the National Liberal Party, the members of the Central Political Bureau, the President of the Senate of the party, the Secretary General of the National Liberal Party, the presidents of the two Chambers of the Parliament (if the officeholders are members of the PNL), the leaders of the National liberal Party's parliamentary groups, the Senators and Deputies, the MEPs, the Ministers, the President of the National Liberal Youth (TNL), the President of the Liberal Women Organisation (OFL), the President of the Liberal Student Clubs (CSL), the President of the League of the Local Elected Officeholders of the National Liberal Party (LAL PNL), the President of the Coordinating Council of the Municipality of Bucharest, the European Commissioner (if the officeholder is member of the PNL).

National Political Bureau 

The National Political Bureau ( – BPN) of the National Liberal Party (PNL) proposes the party's politics and coordinates its application. It ensures the party's day-to-day leadership, and it is composed by the following: the President of the party, the 15 vice-presidents (7 with specific charges, and 8 responsible for the development regions). At the BPC's meetings can assist, with consultative vote, the president of the Senate of the PNL, the Secretary-General of the PNL, the Presidents of the two Chambers of the Parliament (if the officeholders are members of the PNL), the leaders of the National liberal Party's parliamentary groups, the President of the TNL, the President of the OFL, the President of the CSL, the President of the League of the LAL, and the Ministers. The BPC meets weekly, or at any time needed, convoked by the president of the PNL.

According to Article 70 of the PNL Statute, the BPN coordinates and evaluates the objectives of the territorial branches, of the parliamentary groups; it negotiates political agreements (within the limits established by the DP); it coordinates the elections campaign; proposes sanctions according to the Statute; proposes to the DP the political strategy of the party; proposes the candidates for the central executive or public offices; for certain territorial units, proposes to the DP the candidates for the parliamentary elections; proposes to the DP the candidates for the European Parliament elections; proposes the DP to dissolve or dismiss, for exceptional reasons, the territorial branch, or the branch's president; convokes the DP; coordinates the activity of the permanent committees of the National Council, validates or invalidates the results of the elections for the territorial branches; appoints the Secretary-Executive, the Foreign Secretary, and Deputy-Secretaries-General.

The BPN is assisted, in the organizing activity by the Secretary General of the PNL. This office ensures the communication between the central organisms and the territorial branches, ensures the management of the party's assets, is responsible for the informational system. The Secretary-General is assisted by the Deputy-Secretaries-General, appointed by the BPC at the suggestion of the Secretary-General.

As of 2018, the National Political Bureau was composed of the following members:

 President: Ludovic Orban;
 Secretary General: Robert Sighiartău;
 Vice-presidents: Ilie Bolojan, Raluca Turcan, Iulian Dumitrescu, Mircea Hava, Vlad Nistor, Laurențiu Leoreanu, Ben-Oni Ardelean, Florin Cîțu, Dan Motreanu, Nechita-Adrian Oros, Virgil Guran, Ioan Bălan, Victor Paul Dobre, Răducu Filipescu, Gigel Știrbu, Gheorghe Falcă, Lucian Bode, Florin Roman, Marian Petrache, Cristian Bușoi;
 Leader of the PNL Parliamentary Group in the Senate: Iulian Dumitrescu;
 Leader of the PNL Parliamentary Group in the Chamber of Deputies: Raluca Turcan.

In normal conditions, the term of the BPN members ends during the Party's Congress, when the president leaves the presidium of the Congress. The president of the Standing Bureau of the Congress is, formally, the acting president of the party until the new president is elected. The last acting president of the National Liberal Party (PNL) was Mircea Ionescu-Quintus on 20 March 2009, when Crin Antonescu succeeded Călin Popescu-Tăriceanu.

National Council 
The National Council is the debate forum of the National Liberal Party between two Congresses. It reunites twice a year, or at any time necessary, convoked by the president, by the BPC, or at the request of at least half of its members. Its members are: DP, including the members with consultative vote; the Secretaries of State and the equivalent officeholders; the Prefects and Deputy-Prefects; Presidents and vice-presidents of the County Councils; Mayors and Deputy-Mayors of the county capitals, of the sectors of Bucharest, the General Mayor and General Deputy-Mayors of Bucharest; the vice-presidents and Secretaries-General of TNL, OFL, CSL, the Senate of the Party, LAL; honorary members of the party; the President of the structures that deal with specific issues; the Presidents of the CN.

The CN has the following competences: acts to fulfill the decisions of the Congress; adopts the Governing Program; adopts the programs and sectorial politics of the party; approves the reports of the specialty committees; names the candidate of the National Liberal Party for the Romanian Presidency; gives and retracts the quality of honorary member of the party.

According to Article 65 of the Statute, the CN is organized and functions through its permanent specialty committees, constituted on social and professional criteria. The committees constituted on social criteria promote the interests of the correspondent social category. The committees constituted on professional criteria state the sectorial politics and the public politics in major fields, to express the options and solutions proposed by the National Liberal Party.

President 
The President of the National Liberal Party (PNL) is the guardian of the political programme of the party, of the respect of the statute, and the keeper of the unity and prestige of the party.

Secretary-General 
The Secretary-General ensures the communication between the central leading structures and the territorial ones, ensures the management of the assets of the party, is responsible for the informational system. The Secretary-General is helped in its activity by Deputy-Secretaries-General appointed by the BPC, upon the suggestion of the Secretary-General.

Other national structures 
 The Senate of the party – consulting organism for the president regarding the continuity and development of the liberal traditions and concepts;
 Court of Honor and Arbitration – the supreme court of the party;
 Central Committee of Censors – checks the management of the party;
 Ethics Commission – analyzes the candidates proposed for the legislative elections and for the offices in the Government as well as other central offices;
 National Liberal Youth – coordinates the activity specific to the youth structures in the territory;
 League of the Local Elected Officeholders – coordinates the activity of the PNL members in the local public administration (mayors and deputy-mayors, local councilors, county councilors, county council presidents, and deputy-presidents);
 Liberal Women Organisation – coordinates the activity of the territorial women organizations;
 Liberal Student Clubs – promotes the liberal ideas and political program of the PNL through the students.

Local leading structures 
The local leading structures of the National Liberal Party (PNL) are the following:

 the General Assembly of the Members – applies at local level the necessary measures for fulfilling the Program and Strategy.
 the Standing Bureau of the organization – leads the organization between two General Assemblies.

Symbol 

Romanian law requires all parties to present a permanent sign and a permanent electoral sign. The former is used to identify the party's buildings and press releases, and the latter to identify the party's electoral materials and the candidates on the elections ballot. Usually they differ slightly.

The main element of the party is a blue arrow pointing to the upper right corner of a yellow square, and the letters P, N, and L in blue, tilted to the right. The position of the PNL with respect to the arrow depends on the type of symbol, as shown below.

Leadership 

Notes:

1 
2 
3 

4 

5 

6 

7 

8 

9

Presidency span (1990–present)

Notable members

Current notable members 

 Dinu Zamfirescu, one of the 12 founding members of the PNL in January 1990, former BBC reporter, and human rights activist;
 I.V. Săndulescu, one of the 12 founding members of the PNL in January 1990;
 Florin Cîțu, former party president between 25 September 2021 and 2 April 2022, former Prime Minister between December 2020 and October 2021 (acting between October and November 2021), and former Minister of Public Finance between 2019 and 2020;
 Nicolae Ciucă, current Prime Minister since 25 November 2021, former Minister of National Defence, and former acting Prime Minister in December 2020;
 Emil Boc, Mayor of Cluj-Napoca, former Prime Minister of Romania (2008–2012);
 Cătălin Predoiu, current and former Minister of Justice and acting Prime Minister of Romania (2012);
 Leonard Orban, economist, former European Commissioner on multilingualism;
 Crin Antonescu, former party president between 2009 and 2014, former Minister of Youth and Sports, President of the Senate and Acting President of Romania (July–August 2012);
 Vasile Blaga, former co-president of the party between 2014 and 2016, former President of the Senate of Romania between 2011 and 2012;
 Alina Gorghiu, lawyer, former co-president of the party (2014–2016), member of Chamber of Deputies (2008–2016) and former member of the Parliamentary Assembly of the Council of Europe, currently senator of Timiș;
 Nicolae Robu, the Mayor of Timișoara between 2012 and 2020, former senator in Romanian Parliament (2008–2012), member of the Central Bureau and the National Executive Council of the party and former rector of the Politechnic Institute of Timișoara (2004–2012), currently university professor;
 Mircea Hava, former mayor of Alba Iulia and current MEP since 2019;
 Gheorghe Falcă, former mayor of Arad and current MEP since 2019;
 Raluca Turcan, former acting president of the party in 2017;
 Theodor Stolojan, former president of the party between 2002 and 2004, former Prime Minister of Romania (1991–1992), and MEP;
 Andrei Chiliman, former mayor of Sector 1 in Bucharest;
 Crin Halaicu, former Mayor of Bucharest (1992–1996) and businessman;
 Gheorghe Flutur, former ad interim/acting president of the party, current President of the Suceava County Council, and former Minister of Agriculture;
 Teodor Atanasiu, former Minister of National Defence;
 Eugen Nicolăescu, former Minister of Health;
 Daniel Dăianu, MEP, former Minister of Finance, and member of the Romanian Academy;
 Siegfried Mureșan, MEP, spokesman and vice-president of the European People's Party;
 Andrei Marga, former Minister of Education, Minister of External Affairs and rector of the Babeș-Bolyai University;
 Hermann Fabini, architect, art historian, and former senator;
 Ion Lungu, current mayor of Suceava since 2004;
 Roberta Anastase, former President of the Chamber of Deputies of Romania (2008–2012);
 Adrian Cioroianu, former Minister of Foreign Affairs, historian and journalist;
 Ovidiu Raețchi, political analyst;
 Adriana Săftoiu, spokeswoman and political advisor;
 Sorin Cîmpeanu, current and former Minister of National Education;
 Daniel Constantin, former Deputy Prime Minister of Romania, former Minister of Environment, and former Minister of Agriculture and Rural Development.

Former notable members 

 Klaus Iohannis, 5th and incumbent President of Romania;
 Ludovic Orban, former party president and former Prime Minister of Romania between 2019 and 2020, former Minister of Transport between 2007 and 2008;
 Eduard Hellvig, Member of the European Parliament and current Director of the Romanian Intelligence Service (SRI);
 Mihai Răzvan Ungureanu, former Prime Minister of Romania (February–May, 2012) and Head of the Romanian Foreign Intelligence Service (SIE);
 Sorin Frunzăverde, former President of the Caraș-Severin County Council, former MEP, former Minister of Environment, former Minister of Tourism, and former Minister of Defence;
 Radu Câmpeanu, first president of the party after the 1989 Revolution;
 Mircea Ionescu-Quintus, second president of the party after the Romanian Revolution, serving between 1993 and 2001, former President of the Senate, and former Minister of Justice;
 Nicolae Enescu, former Romanian MP and one of the 12 re-founding members of the PNL in January 1990;
 Sorin Bottez, former vice-president of the National Liberal Youth, honorary founding member of PNL and former Minister-Delegate of Public Information in the Ciorbea Cabinet;
 Alexandru Paleologu, essayist, literary critic, and diplomat;
 Theodor Paleologu, historian and diplomat;
 Neagu Djuvara, historian and diplomat;
 Petre Țuțea, philosopher;
 Nicolae Manolescu, literary critic;
 Călin Popescu-Tăriceanu, former Prime Minister and former President of the Senate;
 Bogdan Olteanu, former President of the Chamber of Deputies of Romania;
 Teodor Meleșcanu, former Director of the Foreign Intelligence Service, Foreign Minister and Minister of National Defence;
 Mircea Diaconu, former Minister of Culture and member of the European Parliament, actor;
 Mihai Stănișoară, former Minister of National Defence;
 Norica Nicolai, former MEP;
 Renate Weber, former MEP, former ombudsman between 2019 and 2021, jurist;
 Victor Ciorbea, former Prime Minister between 1996 and 1998 and former ombudsman between 2014 and 2019;
 Ramona Mănescu, former MEP and former Minister of Transport;
 Ovidiu Silaghi, former Minister for Small and Medium Enterprises and former Minister of Transport;
 Radu Stroe, former Minister of Interior;
 Viorel Cataramă, businessman and former senator;
 Dinu Patriciu - businessman and architect;
 Sorin Paliga, former mayor of Sector 3 in Bucharest.

Electoral history

Legislative elections 

Notes:

1 The members of the CDR were the PNȚCD (with 25 senators and 81 deputies), the PNL, the PNL-CD (with 1 senator and 4 deputies), the PAR (with 3 senators and 3 deputies), the PER (with 1 senator and 5 deputies), and the Ecologist Federation of Romania (FER - with 1 senator and 1 deputy).

2 The members of the Justice and Truth Alliance (DA) alliance were the PNL and the PD (with 21 senators and 48 deputies).

3 The Social Liberal Union (USL) was a larger political alliance comprising two other smaller political alliances as follows: the Centre Left Alliance (ACS) and the Centre Right Alliance (ACD). The Centre Left Alliance (ACS) members were the PSD and the UNPR (with 5 senators and 10 deputies). The members of the Centre Right Alliance (ACD) were the PNL (with 51 senators and 101 deputies) and the PC (with 8 senators and 13 deputies). Furthermore, de facto, the PNL became the 2nd largest political party in the Romanian Parliament in the wake of the 2012 Romanian legislative election.

Local elections

National results

Mayor of Bucharest 

 Notes
1 

2 

3 

4

County Council

Presidential elections 

Notes:

1 Emil Constantinescu was the common centre-right candidate that was endorsed by the PNL in both 1992 and 1996 as part of the larger Romanian Democratic Convention (CDR).

2 Traian Băsescu was the common centre-right candidate that was endorsed by the PNL in 2004 as part of the Justice and Truth Alliance (DA) alongside the now defunct Democratic Party (PD).

3 Although Klaus Iohannis was a member of the PNL, he was the common centre-right candidate that was endorsed by the party in 2014 as part of the Christian Liberal Alliance (ACL) alongside the now longtime defunct Democratic Liberal Party (PDL).

European Parliament elections 

Notes:

1 During the 2004–09 EU parliament session, the Parliament of Romania sent 7 delegates on behalf of the PNL to Brussels, Belgium.

2 Subsequently, sought permission to adhere to the European People's Party (EPP) as well as to its affiliated EU Parliament group and had been successfully accepted within it as a full member in the meantime.

See also 
 National Liberal Party (Republic of Moldova)
 Liberalism and radicalism in Romania
 List of political parties in Romania
 List of liberal parties

Notes

References

Further reading 

 PNL website retrieved 8 September 2012;
 Cliveti, Gheorghe, Liberalismul românesc. Eseu istoriografic, Editura Fundației "AXIS", Iași, 1996;
 Istoricul PNL de la 1848 până astăzi, București, 1923;
 Rădulescu – Zoner, Șerban (coord.), Cliveti, Gheorghe, Stan, Apostol, Onişoru, Gheorghe, Șandru, Dumitru, Istoria Partidului Național Liberal, Editura All, București, 2000;
 Stan, Apostol, Iosa, Mircea, Liberalismul politic în România. De la origini până la 1918, Editura Enciclopedică, București, 1996;
 Naumescu, Valentin, Despre liberalism în România. Realităţi, dileme, perspective, EFES, Cluj-Napoca, 2001;
 Șomlea, Vasile-Florin, Mișcarea liberală din România post'1989, Editura Ecumenica Press, Cluj-Napoca, 2006.

External links 

 Official website  
 League of the Local Representatives of the National Liberal Party official site

National Liberal Party
Conservative parties in Romania
Liberal conservative parties
Liberal parties in Romania
Social conservative parties
1990 establishments in Romania